Mancini•Duffy is a New York City-based architecture and interior design firm. Mancini•Duffy was formed by the 1986 merger of Ralph Mancini Associates, Inc. (established in 1981) and Duffy Inc. (established in 1955); in 2011, it acquired certain assets of the interior design firm TSC Design (established in 1995). The firm provides a full range of interior planning, design, and architecture services as well as specialized services such as CAFM, strategic planning, and workplace strategy; graphics and signage; identity and brand development; and product design.

Mancini•Duffy is the operating name of Halsey, McCormack & Helmer, Inc. Originally established in 1915 as Thomas Bruce Boyd Architect, Inc., the corporation reorganized in 1920 and changed its name to Halsey, McCormack & Helmer, Inc. The firm was noted for its prestigious banking projects, including the Williamsburgh Savings Bank in Brooklyn, New York; it was purchased by Duffy Inc. in 1967.

Recent high-profile projects include headquarters relocations for JPMorgan Chase, the CIT Group, Condé Nast Publications, and AOL; a headquarters build-out for Time Warner at Time Warner Center; new television studios and production facilities for NBC Sports Group in Stamford, CT; and an ongoing renovation of Bloomingdale's flagship store in Manhattan. The firm placed at #54 in Interior Design's 2012 "Giants" survey.

A former tenant of Two World Trade Center, Mancini•Duffy's New York offices were destroyed in the September 11, 2001 attacks. Its New York office is currently located in Midtown Manhattan.

See also
 People's Bank and Trust Company Building – Designed by Halsey, McCormack and Helmer, built 1931, listed on the National Register of Historic Places

References

External links 
 Mancini•Duffy's website
 Brief officeinsight article about firm anniversary
 Metropolis Magazine article on World Trade Center attacks
From the Archives: The Williamsburgh Savings Bank Tower
NYCLPC Designation Report for Williamsburgh Savings Bank Building (1977)
NYCLPC Designation Report for Williamsburgh Savings Bank Building First Floor Interior (1996)
Brooklyn Historical Society: Williamsburgh Savings Bank Building photographs

Architecture firms based in New York City
Companies based in Manhattan